Mongkol Borei can refer to:
Mongkol Borei District, a district of Banteay Meanchey Province in north eastern Cambodia
Mongkol Borei River, a river that flows through the district to the Tonle Sap 
Mongkol Borei (town), the capital of Mongkol Borei District